Australeuma is a genus of Tasmanian millipede in the family Metopidiotrichidae.

Species 
The following species are recognized:

Australeuma gladifer Shear & Mesibov, 1997
Australeuma golovatchi Shear & Mesibov, 1997
Australeuma jeekeli Golovatch, 1986
Australeuma mauriesi Shear & Mesibov, 1997
Australeuma peckorum Shear & Mesibov, 1997
Australeuma simile Golovatch, 1986

References 

Animals described in 1986
Arthropods of Tasmania
Chordeumatida
Millipede genera